Nauru-Taiwan relations are relations between the Republic of Nauru and Taiwan (officially the Republic of China).

History
In 1980, Nauru established official relations with the ROC. In 2002, however, the government of Rene Harris established relations with the PRC, and adopted the One China Policy. Consequently, Taiwan severed its relations with Nauru, and accused the PRC of having bought Nauru's allegiance with financial aid of over €90,000,000. A reporter for The Age agreed, stating that "Beijing recently bought off a threat by Nauru to revert to Taiwan only six months after opening ties with the mainland, offering a large loan to Nauru's near-destitute Government".

In 2003, Nauru closed its newly established embassy in Beijing. Two years later, ROC President Chen met Nauruan President Ludwig Scotty in the Marshall Islands. In May 2005, the ROC and Nauru re-established diplomatic relations, and opened embassies in each other's capitals. The PRC consequently severed its relations with Nauru.

The ROC is one of Nauru's two foremost economic aid partners (with Australia). In return, Nauru uses its seat in the United Nations to support the ROC's admittance proposal. Taiwan provides regular medical assistance to Nauru, sending specialised doctors to the country's only hospital.

In 2007, Scotty was re-elected, amidst claims that his electoral campaign had been funded by Taiwan. Scotty's opponents claimed that the ROC wanted to ensure that a pro-Taiwan government remained in power. Scotty was replaced by Marcus Stephen in December 2007. Following Stephen's election, President Chen telephoned him to congratulate him, assure him of the ROC's continued assistance for Nauru, request Nauru's continued support in return, and invite him to visit Taiwan.

Nauru remains the focus of diplomatic competition between Beijing and Taipei. In 2006, according to the New Statesman, President Scotty "was allegedly accosted by a horde of screaming Chinese officials who tried to drag him on to a plane to Beijing just as he was boarding one bound for Taipei".

In 2011 WikiLeaks revealed that Taiwan had been paying a "monthly stipend" to Nauruan government ministers in exchange for their continued support, as well as a smaller sum to other members of parliament, as "project funding that requires minimal accounting". Reporting on the story, the Brisbane Times wrote: "One MP reportedly used his Taiwanese stipend to buy daily breakfast for all schoolchildren in his district, while others were happy to just pocket the cash". A "former Australian diplomat with close knowledge of politics in Nauru" stated that Nauruan President Marcus Stephen, Foreign Minister Kieren Keke and former President Ludwig Scotty, among others, had all accepted "under the counter" funding from Taiwan. The leaks revealed that "Chinese [PRC] agents had also sought to influence Nauru's elections through cash payments to voters, with at least $40,000 distributed in one instance in 2007".

WikiLeaks also revealed that Australia had, at one time, been "pushing" Nauru to break its relations with Taiwan and establish relations with the PRC instead. Then President Scotty had reportedly resisted on the grounds that it was "none of Australia's business".

In late 2011, Taiwan "doubled its health aid" to Nauru, notably providing a resident medical team on a five-year appointment.

In 2018, a diplomatic row between the PRC and Nauru occurred at the Pacific Islands Forum when Nauruans would only stamp entry visas on personal passports of Mainland diplomats rather than diplomatic ones.

See also
 Solomon Islands-Taiwan relations
 Australia–Taiwan relations

References

Bilateral relations of Taiwan
Taiwan